Primula algida is a species of flowering plant within the family Primulaceae. This species was first described by Michael Friedrich Adams.

Description 
Primula algida is a perennial species. Leaves are elliptic and grow from 1 – 6 cm long. The plant can grow from 3 – 20 cm tall when in flower due to its stem. Each stem holds 4 or more flowers, which can range in colour from mauve to violet. The roots of this species are thin and white.

Distribution 
The native range of P. algida includes: Caucasus, Northern Iran, Northern Altai Republic, Mongolia, Pamir-Alay and Afghanistan.

Habitat 
Primula algida grows on moist ground among grasses in alpine areas and wet meadows.

It also inhabits south facing rock ledges, cliffs and slopes.

This species is found at elevations between 2000-7000m.

Gallery

References 

algida
Plants described in 1805
Flora of Afghanistan
Flora of Iran
Flora of Altai (region)
Flora of Mongolia